The following is a list of rosters of the UCI Continental team, Felbermayr–Simplon Wels categorised by season.

2016 
Roster in 2016, age as of 1 January 2016:

2015

References

Lists of cyclists by team